Umyar Mavlikhanov (24 September 1937 – 14 July 1999) was a Soviet fencer. He won gold in the team sabre events at the 1964 and 1968 Summer Olympics and a bronze in the individual sabre in 1964.

References

1937 births
1999 deaths
Russian male fencers
Soviet male fencers
Olympic fencers of the Soviet Union
Fencers at the 1960 Summer Olympics
Fencers at the 1964 Summer Olympics
Fencers at the 1968 Summer Olympics
Olympic gold medalists for the Soviet Union
Olympic bronze medalists for the Soviet Union
Olympic medalists in fencing
Martial artists from Moscow
Medalists at the 1964 Summer Olympics
Medalists at the 1968 Summer Olympics